moi Caprice is an indie rock band from Denmark. Current members are Michael Møller, David Brunsgaard, Casper Henning Hansen, Jacob Funch and Fridolin Nordsø.  The band, formed as early as 1993 as Concrete Puppet Frog, rose to visibility in 1997 as the first unsigned band to top the Danish alternative music charts in 1997, despite the lack of a released studio album.  The band has remained active, releasing four albums beginning in 2003, and by touring internationally, including performances in Canada and Vietnam.

Their third album, released in 2006, earned them four Critics Award nominations and two nominations for Danish Music Awards, and they won the prize for best band at the Danish critics award, Steppeulven.

Discography

Studio albums 
2003: Once upon a Time in the North
2005: You Can’t Say No Forever
2006: The Art of Kissing Properly
2008: We Had Faces Then
2020: Becoming Visible

EPs and singles 
2002: Daisies and Beatrice (CD-EP) (May 2002)
2002: Summerfool (CD-EP) (October 2002)
2003: Artboy Meets Artgirl (CD-EP) (January 2003)
2007: To The Lighthouse (remixes) (Vinyl 12")

Compilations 
2002: Singles Collection (11 songs and 3 videos from earlier EPs. Popsicle, 2002)

References

External links 

 
 

Danish indie rock groups